Zimran Clottey is a Ghanaian actor, writer, musician, film director and a teacher, popularly known as "Aluta" which was his name in the TV series Things We Do for Love. He is married with seven children; two are twins. He started acting at the age of six in Children's Own, a TT programme on Ghana Broadcasting Corporation (GBC) hosted by the late Tina Moses in the 1980s. 

He was a member of the drama club in Achimota School. He is a Ga from Ga Mashie. He was the host of Pop Box, a TV programme on Ghana Television.

Education 
He went to Christ The King International School then proceeded to Achimota School.

Filmography 
 Things we do for love
 Number 10 Kotokraba Close
 The house party
 Akushika
 The Oil City

References 

1970s births
Living people
Ghanaian actors
Ga-Adangbe people
Alumni of Achimota School